Ekaterina Makarova and Elena Vesnina were the defending champions, but Makarova withdrew due to injury. Vesnina was scheduled to partner with Marina Erakovic, but Erakovic withdrew before the first round for personal reasons.
Cara Black and Sania Mirza won the title, defeating Vera Dushevina and Arantxa Parra Santonja in the final, 6–2, 6–2.

Seeds

Draw

Finals

Top half

Bottom half

References
 Main Draw

Open Womens Doubles